Edmond Maillard (24 July 1896 – 7 April 1969) was a Chilean cyclist. He competed in the team pursuit and time trial events at the 1928 Summer Olympics.

References

External links
 

1896 births
1969 deaths
Chilean male cyclists
Olympic cyclists of Chile
Cyclists at the 1928 Summer Olympics
Place of birth missing
People from Talca